Hannes Baumann (born 9 August 1982) is a German sailor. He competed at the 2012 Summer Olympics in the 49er class.

Early life
Hannes Baumann was born in Bad Saarow-Pieskow. He started sailing at the age of 11 and started racing at 12. His favorites hobbies apart from sailing are : cycling, snowboarding, surfing. The person he admires the most is Robert Scheidt.

References

External links
 
 
 
 

1982 births
Living people
People from Oder-Spree
People from Bezirk Frankfurt
German male sailors (sport)
Sportspeople from Brandenburg
Olympic sailors of Germany
Sailors at the 2012 Summer Olympics – 49er